Vasile Ghioc (born 28 February 1978 in Bucharest) is a former Romanian rugby union player. He played as a wing.

Club career
During his career, Ghioc played mostly for Dinamo București in Romania and for București Wolves a Romanian professional rugby union team based in Bucharest and competed with both teams in the European Rugby Challenge Cup competition. In 2003 he moved to English-based club Launceston only to return to Dinamo a short period of time after his stint in English rugby.

International career
Ghioc gathered 22 caps for Romania, from his debut in 2000 against Italy to his last game in 2008 against Portugal. He was a member of his national side for the 6th  Rugby World Cup in 2003, where he played a single match in Pool A against Argentina.

References

External links
 
 
 

1978 births
Living people
Romanian rugby union players
Romania international rugby union players
Rugby union wings
CS Dinamo București (rugby union) players
Rugby union players from Bucharest